Freedom Township is a township in Republic County, Kansas, United States, that was organized in 1871.

References

Townships in Republic County, Kansas
Townships in Kansas